The Pinto Kid may refer to:

 The Pinto Kid (1928 film), a silent western film directed by Louis King 
 The Pinto Kid (1941 film), a western film directed by Lambert Hillyer